

2000s

2010s

2020s

See also
 List of people who disappeared mysteriously
 Chris Clark, author who writes and produces documentaries about unsolved crimes
 David Smith, convicted killer suspected of being responsible for unsolved murders

References

Lists of victims of crimes
 
United Kingdom crime-related lists
Lists of events in the United Kingdom
United Kingdom unsolved